Anguloa clowesii is a species of orchid.

Gallery

References

External links 
 
 

clowesii
Orchids of Venezuela
Orchids of Colombia
Plants described in 1844